Noël Vantyghem (born 9 October 1947 – 10 June 1994) was a Belgian professional cyclist.

Vantyghem's biggest win was the 1972 Paris–Tours. Later, he remarked "Together with Eddy Merckx, I won all classics races that could be won. I won Paris–Tours, he the rest."

Major results

1968
 1st  National Amateur Road Race Championships
 1st Stage 2 Peace Race
 2nd Overall Tour of Greece
1st Stage 2
1969
 2nd GP Isbergues
 2nd Kuurne–Brussels–Kuurne
1970
 1st Grand Prix de Fourmies
 1st Circuit des Frontières
 2nd Schaal Sels
 2nd De Kustpijl
1971
 1st Stage 2 Tour d'Indre-et-Loire
 3rd Omloop Het Volk
1972
 1st Paris–Tours
 1st Circuit des Frontières
 1st Schaal Sels 
 1st Stage 2 Four Days of Dunkirk
 2nd Dwars door Vlaanderen
 2nd Grote Prijs Stad Zottegem
 3rd De Kustpijl
 3rd Dwars door West–Vlaanderen
 3rd Rund um den Henninger Turm
 3rd Grand Prix de Fourmies
 9th Omloop Het Volk
1973
 1st Nokere Koerse
 4th Omloop Het Volk

References

External links
 

1947 births
1994 deaths
Belgian male cyclists